Nissa may refer to:

 Caltanissetta, a commune in Sicily, known as Nissa in Sicilian
 A.S.D. S.C. Nissa 1962, a football club in Caltanissetta, Sicily
 Niš, a city in Serbia, formerly also known as Nissa